My Heart Is Not Broken Yet is a 2007 South Korean documentary film which tells the story of a former comfort woman, Song Sin-do, who filed a lawsuit against the Japanese government to seek redress for the comfort women who were drafted into sexual slavery for the Japanese troops during World War II. Although the court dismissed the case after a decade-long battle, Song firmly stands, defiant of the ruling: "My case may have been broken in court. But my heart is not broken yet." It was first released in Japan in August 2007.

It won JJ-Star Award's Special Mention at the 9th Jeonju International Film Festival in 2008.

Cast 
Song Sin-do as herself
Moon So-ri as narrator
BTS as themselves

Awards and nominations

References

External links 
 
 
 

2000s Korean-language films
South Korean documentary films
Films directed by Ahn Hae-ryong
2007 documentary films
2000s South Korean films